Rhodeus monguonensis is a species of freshwater ray-finned fish in the genus Rhodeus.  It is endemic to China.

References

Rhodeus
Fish described in 1989